The following is a chronicle of events during the year 1978 in ice hockey.

National Hockey League
Art Ross Trophy as the NHL's leading scorer during the regular season:  Guy Lafleur]  
Hart Memorial Trophy: for the NHL's Most Valuable Player:  
Stanley Cup -   1978 Stanley Cup Finals
With the first overall pick in the 1978 NHL Amateur Draft,

World Hockey Association
*the Winnipeg Jets won the Account World Trophy

Canadian Hockey League
Ontario Hockey League:  J. Ross Robertson Cup.
Quebec Major Junior Hockey League:  won President's Cup (QMJHL) for the first time in team history
Western Hockey League:   President's Cup (WHL) for the first time in team history
Memorial Cup:

International hockey

World Hockey Championship

European hockey

Minor League hockey
AHL:   Calder Cup
IHL:   Turner Cup.
 Allan Cup:

Junior A hockey

University hockey
 NCAA Division I Men's Ice Hockey Tournament

Deaths

Season articles

See also
1978 in sports

References